The Bail Act 1898 (61 & 62 Vict c 7) was an Act of the Parliament of the United Kingdom.

It amended the Indictable Offences Act 1848, which gave justices the power to give bail on sureties, to allow the justices to dispense with the need for sureties if they felt that doing so would not "tend to defeat the ends of justice"; this prevented the unhelpful situation where someone who was at no risk of absconding was kept imprisoned for long periods of time because they could not find the wherewithal to post bail.

References

United Kingdom Acts of Parliament 1898
Bail
Criminal law of the United Kingdom